Saulius Pečeliūnas (born 19 January 1956) is a Lithuanian politician.  In 1990 he was among those who signed the Act of the Re-Establishment of the State of Lithuania.

References
 Biography

1961 births
Living people
Vilnius Gediminas Technical University alumni
Members of the Seimas
21st-century Lithuanian politicians
Place of birth missing (living people)